The Walter Atlas was a nine-cylinder, air-cooled, radial engine for aircraft use built in Czechoslovakia in the early 1930s.

Design and development
The Atlas was the largest capacity and most powerful radial engine design developed by the Walter company. The engine was an attempt at high power output by using a much larger bore size than company's previous range. The engine was test run in spring 1930, encountering problems with cooling and operation.

The engine appeared at the Paris Aerosalon in December of that year. The engine did not attract any customers, further development was cancelled in 1931 and the company moved to producing licensed versions of the Bristol Mercury, Pegasus and Gnome-Rhône 14M.

Variants
Atlas I
Direct drive, maximum power  at 1,950 rpm.

Atlas IR
Geared drive (ratio 1: 1.625), maximum power  hp at 1,950 rpm.

Specifications

See also

References

Němeček, Václav. Československá letadla I (1918-1945) (Czechoslovak Aircraft I (1918-1945)). Third edition, Naše vojsko, Prague. 1983.

Atlas
1930s aircraft piston engines
Aircraft air-cooled radial piston engines